A stable is a building in which livestock, especially horses, are kept.  It most commonly means a building that is divided into separate stalls for individual animals and livestock. There are many different types of stables in use today; the American-style barn, for instance, is a large barn with a door at each end and individual stalls inside or free-standing stables with top and bottom-opening doors.  The term "stable" is also used to describe a group of animals kept by one owner, regardless of housing or location.

The exterior design of a stable can vary widely, based on climate, building materials, historical period and cultural styles of architecture. A wide range of building materials can be used, including masonry (bricks or stone), wood and steel. Stables also range widely in size, from a small building housing one or two animals to facilities at agricultural shows or race tracks that can house hundreds of animals.

History 
The stable is typically historically the second-oldest building type on the farm. The world’s oldest horse stables were discovered in the ancient city of Pi-Ramesses in Qantir, in Ancient Egypt, and were established by Ramesses II (c. 1304–1213 BC). These stables covered approximately 182,986 square feet, had floors sloped for drainage, and could contain about 480 horses.
Free-standing stables began to be built from the 16th century. They were well built and placed near the house  because these animals were highly valued and carefully maintained. They were once vital to the economy and an indicator of their owners' position in the community. Relatively few examples survive of complete interiors (i.e. with stalls, mangers and feed racks) from the mid-19th century or earlier.

Traditionally, stables in Great Britain had a hayloft on their first (i.e. upper) floor and a pitching door at the front.  Doors and windows were symmetrically arranged.  Their interiors were divided into stalls and usually included a large stall for a foaling mare or sick horse. The floors were cobbled (or, later, bricked) and featured drainage channels. Outside steps to the first floor were common for farm hands to live in the building.

Horses 

For horses, stables are often part of a larger complex which includes trainers, vets and farriers.

Other uses 

The word stable is also used metonymically to refer to the collection of horses that the building contains (for example, the college's stable includes a wide variety of breeds) and even, by extension, metaphorically to refer to a group of people—often (but not exclusively) athletes—trained, coached, supervised or managed by the same person or organisation. For example, art galleries typically refer to the artists they represent as their stable of artists. Analogously, car enthusiast magazines sometimes speak of collectible cars in this way, referring to the cars in a collector's stable (most especially when the metaphor can play on the word association of pony cars). 

Historically, the headquarters of a unit of cavalry, not simply their horses' accommodation, was known as a "stable".

Gallery

See also 

Glossary of equestrian terms
Horse management
Livery stable
Nativity of Jesus
Pen

References 

 
Agricultural buildings
Buildings and structures used to confine animals
Horse management